Phoenix is the sixth studio album by American rock band Grand Funk Railroad. It was released on October 12, 1972, by Capitol Records. The album was produced by Grand Funk and marks the band's first album not produced by Terry Knight. "Rock & Roll Soul" was released as a single and went to #29 on the Billboard Hot 100 in 1972.

Track listing 
All songs written by Mark Farner.
Side one
"Flight of the Phoenix" – 3:38
"Trying to Get Away" – 4:11
"Someone" – 4:04
"She Got to Move Me" – 4:48
"Rain Keeps Fallin'" – 3:25
Side two
"I Just Gotta Know" – 3:52
"So You Won't Have to Die" – 3:21
"Freedom Is for Children" – 6:06
"Gotta Find Me a Better Day" – 4:07
"Rock 'N Roll Soul" – 3:40

Bonus track (CD release) 
"Flight of the Phoenix" (Remix with extended ending) – 5:22

Personnel 

Grand Funk Railroad 
 Mark Farner – guitar, harmonica, vocals; organ on "Flight of the Phoenix"
 Mel Schacher – bass
 Don Brewer – drums, congas, percussion, vocals

Additional personnel 
 Craig Frost – organ, clavinet, harpsichord, piano
 Doug Kershaw – electric violin

Charts 
Album

Singles

References 

1972 albums
Grand Funk Railroad albums
Capitol Records albums
Albums with cover art by Drew Struzan